Christos Anesti ( - "Christ is Risen!") may refer to:
Paschal greeting, used by Christians during the Easter season
Paschal troparion, a hymn in the Eastern Orthodox Church